Megan Jovon Ruth Pete (born February 15, 1995), known professionally as Megan Thee Stallion (pronounced "Megan the Stallion"), is an American rapper. Originally from Houston, Texas, she first garnered attention when videos of her freestyling became popular on social media platforms such as Instagram. Megan Thee Stallion signed to 300 Entertainment in 2018, where she released the mixtape Fever (2019) and the extended play Suga (2020), both of which reached the top ten of the Billboard 200.

She released her debut studio album Good News (2020) to critical acclaim, appearing on several year-end best album lists. She earned her first and second number-one singles on the US Billboard Hot 100 with the remix of her song "Savage" (featuring Beyoncé), and her feature on Cardi B's single "WAP"; the latter of which was her first number one in several other countries, as well as the Billboard Global 200 chart. In 2021, she was featured alongside Doja Cat on the remix of Ariana Grande's 2020 single "34+35", which reached number two on the Billboard Hot 100. She followed this with her debut compilation album Something for Thee Hotties (2021), which reached the top ten on the Billboard 200, and spawned the single "Thot Shit", which reached the top twenty in the US, and received a Grammy Award for Best Rap Performance nomination.

In July 2020, Megan Thee Stallion was the victim of a shooting committed by rapper Tory Lanez in Hollywood Hills, California. The shooting was a major element of her debut album, Good News. In December 2022, Lanez was tried and convicted on all counts in relation to the attack on her.

Throughout her career, Megan Thee Stallion has received several accolades, including six BET Awards, five BET Hip Hop Awards, four American Music Awards, two MTV Video Music Awards, a Billboard Women in Music Award, and three Grammy Awards. At the 63rd Annual Grammy Awards, she became the second female rapper to win Best New Artist, after Lauryn Hill in 1999. In 2020, Time named her one of the 100 most influential people in the world on their annual list. Outside of music, she has focused on her education, graduating from Texas Southern University with a Bachelor of Science in Health Administration in 2021.

Early life and education 
Megan Jovon Ruth Pete was born on February 15, 1995, in San Antonio, Texas, and her mother, Holly Thomas, immediately moved to Houston after her birth. Thomas rapped under the name "Holly-Wood" and would bring her daughter with her to recording sessions instead of putting her in daycare. Pete was raised in the South Park neighborhood of Houston before moving with her mother to Pearland at age 14, where she lived until she turned 18. Pete began writing raps at age 14. When she eventually showed Thomas her rapping skills at age 18, Thomas required that Pete wait until she was 21 to pursue rapping as a career. Her mother commented that her lyrics were too sexually suggestive for her young age. Pete attended Pearland High School and graduated in 2013. Her father died during her freshman year of high school.

In 2013, while Pete was a student at Prairie View A&M University, she began uploading videos of herself freestyling on social media. A clip of Pete battling against male opponents in a "cypher" went viral. The exposure helped Pete gain a larger digital presence and following on social media. She garnered fans by posting her freestyles on her Instagram while in college. She refers to her fans as "hotties" and credits her hyperactive fan base for her early success. After taking time off from school, Pete resumed her studies at Texas Southern University. She graduated on December 11, 2021, with a Bachelor of Science in health administration.

She adopted the stage name "Megan Thee Stallion" because she was called a "stallion" in adolescence due to her height and "thick" body frame; voluptuous and statuesque women in the Southern United States are colloquially called "stallions".

Career

2016–2017: Early beginnings
In April 2016, Megan Thee Stallion released her first single "Like a Stallion". This was followed by the small SoundCloud-exclusive mixtapes Rich Ratchet (2016), and Megan Mix (2017). In September 2017, Megan Thee Stallion made her professional solo debut with the commercially released EP Make It Hot. The EP's 2017 single "Last Week in HTx" became her most successful single during this time, amassing several million views on YouTube. In 2017, Megan Thee Stallion released the song "Stalli (Freestyle)", as a rework of late musician XXXTentacion's "Look at Me!".

Around this time, Megan Thee Stallion auditioned to be a cast member on Love & Hip Hop: Houston; however, the proposed spin-off of the Love & Hip Hop franchise was postponed indefinitely in June 2016.

2018–2019: Tina Snow and Fever
In early 2018, Megan Thee Stallion signed with 1501 Certified Entertainment, an independent label in Houston run by T. Farris and owned by former baseball player Carl Crawford. The first female rapper signed to the label, she then performed at SXSW in March 2018. In June 2018, Megan Thee Stallion released a 10-song extended play titled Tina Snow under the label. The EP was named after her alter ego, "Tina Snow", who she describes as "a more raw version" of herself. Tina Snow was positively received by critics. Eric Torres of Pitchfork wrote: "she provided plenty of freak anthems with quotable lyrics to wield against ain't-shit men". She stated in an interview with Mic that she is not afraid to talk about sexuality, nor does she feel boxed in to either the "intelligent" or "freak" dichotomy. Nandi Howard of The Fader referred to her ability to rap with "electrifying pace and precision". In November 2018, Megan Thee Stallion announced that she had signed with 300 Entertainment, making her the first female rapper to be signed by the label. It was during this time that she was scheduled to support Australian rapper Iggy Azalea on her Bad Girls Tour; however, the tour was later cancelled.

On January 22, 2019, Megan Thee Stallion released "Big Ole Freak" as a single from her EP, Tina Snow, and also filmed a music video for the track. The single, "Is It Love This Time", is sampled throughout the single. On April 15, "Big Ole Freak" charted at number 99 on the Billboard Hot 100 giving Megan Thee Stallion her first chart entry, with it later peaking at number 65 on the Hot 100. Fever, her second mixtape, was released on May 17, 2019. The album received critical acclaim and landed on several year-end critics lists, with Paper calling it the best album of 2019. Taylor Crumpton of Pitchfork rated the album 8/10 and wrote in the review, "Megan's delivery of perfectly executed bars are comparable to successions from a fully automatic machine gun; a carefully studied aim of fiery stanzas that could only be carried by a rapper with extensive knowledge of the genre's early practices of battle rap." On May 21, 2019, she released the music video for the opening album track, "Realer", which is inspired by the blaxploitation film style. On June 20, 2019, she was announced to be one of eleven artists included in the 12th edition of XXLs "Freshman Class". Her freestyle in the cypher was praised by music critics. In July 2019, Chance The Rapper released his debut studio album, The Big Day, and Megan Thee Stallion was featured on the track, "Handsome". On August 2, 2019, A Black Lady Sketch Show premiered on HBO; the show uses Megan Thee Stallion's song "Hot Girl" in the opening title sequence.

On August 9, 2019, Megan Thee Stallion released the single "Hot Girl Summer", featuring fellow American rapper Nicki Minaj and singer Ty Dolla Sign. The song, an ode to her viral "hot girl summer" meme, came about after an Instagram Live session between Minaj and Megan Thee Stallion. It peaked at number 11 on the US Billboard Hot 100, becoming Megan Thee Stallion's first top 20 single, and topped the Rolling Stone 100. The week thereafter, she featured on Quality Control compilation album, Quality Control: Control the Streets, Volume 2, on the track "Pastor", alongside Quavo and City Girls. In September 2019, Megan Thee Stallion signed a management deal with Roc Nation. In October 2019, she created and starred in a horror series, Hottieween, directed by Teyana Taylor. In that same month, she performed a NPR Tiny Desk Concert during the Tiny Desk Fest. In November 2019, Time placed Megan Thee Stallion on their inaugural "Time 100 Next" list.

2020–21: Career stardom and Good News
In January 2020, Megan Thee Stallion released the single "Diamonds" with singer Normani, for the soundtrack of the superhero film Birds of Prey released the same year. That same month, she announced her debut album Suga and released the lead single "B.I.T.C.H.". In February 2020, she featured on the single "Fkn Around" by Phony Ppl, and appeared on The Tonight Show Starring Jimmy Fallon, performing "B.I.T.C.H.". The next month, she announced that her debut album was delayed as a result of her attempting to renegotiate her contract with 1501 Certified. She started the hashtag "#FreeTheeStallion" to raise awareness of the issue, noting that "[she did not] understand some of the verbiage" when she signed the initial contract with 1501.

On March 6, 2020, she released the EP, Suga, against the wishes of 1501, after a judge granted a temporary restraining order against the label. That same month, the song "Savage" from the EP went viral on TikTok, when popular user Keara Wilson used it for a dance challenge video, which racked up 15.7 million views and 2.4 million likes as of March 20, 2020. A remix featuring Beyoncé was released on April 29, 2020. The song became Megan Thee Stallion's first top 10 entry in the United States shortly after the remix's release, eventually becoming her first chart topper in the country. "Savage" also helped boost Sugas sales, propelling it up to number 7 on the Billboard 200. Proceeds from the song went to Houston nonprofit Bread of Life which provides disaster relief for residents affected by COVID-19. Megan Thee Stallion was also judge on the HBO Max voguing competition show Legendary which debuted in May 2020. She released the song "Girls in the Hood" on June 26, 2020, before featuring on Cardi B's single "WAP" and appearing in its music video in August 2020. "WAP" became her second number-one single in the U.S., breaking the record for the most streams for a song in its first week of release in the U.S. (93 million).

Megan Thee Stallion became a Global Brand Ambassador for Revlon in August 2020. She received her first-ever Billboard Music Award nomination when she was nominated for Top Rap Female Artist in September 2020. A few days later, she was featured in the annual Time 100 list of the most influential people in the world. Her write-up for this listing was composed by American actress Taraji P. Henson. Megan Thee Stallion tied with Drake when she received eight nominations at the 2020 BET Hip Hop Awards, including Artist of the Year, Song of the Year and Album of the Year. She also tied with Justin Bieber as the most nominated musician at the 2020 People's Choice Awards, earning six nominations each. Megan Thee Stallion would also become the second most-nominated act at the 2020 American Music Awards. In October 2020, she released the single, "Don't Stop" featuring rapper Young Thug, and promoted it by performing it on the 46th season premiere of Saturday Night Live. She performed a "politically charged" version of "Savage" that evening, in which she addressed racism, the Attorney General of Kentucky Daniel Cameron, and sent a message about the importance of protecting black women and the Black Lives Matter movement. She continued working for this cause by writing an op-ed for The New York Times titled "Why I Speak Up for Black Women", which received acclaim. Megan Thee Stallion appeared in the 2020 comedy special Sarah Cooper: Everything's Fine. She received four nominations at the 63rd Annual Grammy Awards, including Best New Artist and Record of the Year for "Savage (Remix)". She went on to win the former, which made her the first female hip hop artist to do so since Lauryn Hill in 1999, as well as Best Rap Song and Best Rap Performance, both for "Savage (Remix)".

On November 13, 2020, Megan Thee Stallion announced the release of her debut studio album Good News, which was released on November 20, 2020. The release of the album also coincided with its fourth single "Body" as well as its music video. The album debuted at number 2 on the Billboard 200 and at number 1 on the Top R&B/Hip-Hop Albums with over 100,000 album-equivalent units sold. On January 14, 2021, Megan Thee Stallion was featured on the remix of Ariana Grande's single "34+35", the second single from her sixth studio album Positions alongside American singer and rapper Doja Cat. A music video for the remix was later released on February 12, 2021. In June, she released the single "Thot Shit" with a music video that follows around an hypocritical social conservative politician. Megan Thee Stallion won the most awards at the 2021 BET Awards ceremony with four. Boy band BTS released a remix of the single "Butter" featuring the rapper, which reached number three on the Billboard Global 200. She also led the nominations for the 2021 BET Hip Hop Awards along with Cardi B, with nine each; both rappers won the most awards during the ceremony with three for "WAP". Megan Thee Stallion was featured on DJ Snake's single "SG", along with Ozuna and Lisa of Blackpink, released in October. Megan released Something for Thee Hotties, a collection of previously unreleased songs and freestyles, on October 29, 2021. The compilation album debuted at number five on the US Billboard 200, becoming Megan Thee Stallion's fourth top 10.

On September 16, 2021, Post Malone announced the Posty Fest 2021 lineup, with Megan Thee Stallion as one of the performers at the festival based in Arlington, Texas, next October. Megan was honored as one of Glamours Women of the Year in November. Megan won three awards at the 2021 American Music Awards, tying with Doja Cat and BTS for the most during the night.

Megan Thee Stallion graduated from Texas Southern University on December 11, 2021. Shortly after, Megan was honored with the 18th Congressional District of Texas Hero Award by Rep. Sheila Jackson Lee for her philanthropy efforts in Houston. In the coming days after Megan's graduation, she signed an exclusive first-look deal with Netflix that will see her create and produce executive content, including television series and other projects.

2022–present: Traumazine
On March 11, 2022, Megan Thee Stallion released a collaboration with English singer Dua Lipa, named "Sweetest Pie". On March 27, Megan made a surprise appearance at the 94th Academy Awards where she performed alongside various artists "We Don't Talk About Bruno" from the film Encanto. Megan made history becoming the 2nd female rapper to perform the Academy Awards, the first being Queen Latifah in the 81st Academy Awards ceremony. She received acclaim at the Oscars for the surprise performance, with Rolling Stone stating: "Megan Thee Stallion Makes 'Encanto' Track...All the More Magical at Oscars."

Outside of music, on February 15, 2022 - her birthday - Megan Thee Stallion announced the launching of a nonprofit, the Pete and Thomas Foundation, in honor of her late mother and father Holly Thomas & Joseph Pete Jr. The foundation seeks to help underserved communities in Houston, Texas and beyond with education, housing, and health and wellness needs. On May 1, 2022, the Mayor of Houston Sylvester Turner honored Megan for her philanthropic and humanitarian efforts for the Houston people by proclaiming May 2 Megan Thee Stallion Day in Houston, Texas, which falls on the same day as her grandmother and late mother's birthday. She received an honorary key to the City of Houston, a symbolic cowboy hat and belt buckle. In a Rolling Stone cover story, Megan revealed that she collaborated with Future for her upcoming second album on a song titled "Pressurelicious".

On August 11, 2022, Megan Thee Stallion took to Twitter to announce that her second studio album Traumazine would be released the next day.

Artistry

Public image 
Megan Thee Stallion is known for her confidence, sensuality, and explicit lyrics. She presents her sexuality throughout her lyrics, videos, and live performances. In an interview with Pitchfork she stated, "It's not just about being sexy, it's about being confident and me being confident in my sexuality." On her Texas rap origins, she told Rolling Stone, "I don't feel like we ever really had a female rapper come from Houston or Texas and shut shit down. So that's where I'm coming from."

Influences 
Megan Thee Stallion cites her mother as her first and biggest influence. She has considered Pimp C and his 2006 solo album, Pimpalation, an influence since her childhood, admiring his talk-rap delivery and "cockiness", and stating that she wants to inspire the same confidence that the rapper does through his music. Other inspirations she has named are the Notorious B.I.G., Lil' Kim, Queen Latifah, and Three 6 Mafia, and she credits Q-Tip as her mentor. She has said in interviews that when she was coming of age in the 2000s, she would listen to her favorite rap songs from acts like Three 6 Mafia and Pimp C, and ask herself, "How good would this sound if a girl did it?"

She has also been influenced by Beyoncé. In her Grammy Awards acceptance speech with Beyoncé for "Savage", she said: "Ever since I was little, I was like, 'you know what? One day, I'm gonna grow up and I'm gonna be like the rap Beyoncé.' That was definitely my goal. [..] I love her work ethic, I love the way she is, I love the way she carries herself." In a Teen Vogue interview, she spoke about Nicki Minaj as another influence:  "[she] was here before us, so this is who we had to look at, at this time. So, definitely she has been an inspiration to me."

Alter egos
In multiple interviews, Megan Thee Stallion has referred to herself as "Tina Snow", one of her alter egos and also the name of her debut EP, Tina Snow. It was influenced by Pimp C's alias Tony Snow, and has similar confidence and an unapologetically sexually dominant delivery. "Hot Girl Meg" is another alter ego who is described as embodying Megan Thee Stallion's carefree and outgoing side, which she compares to a "college, party girl." She stated that she introduced "Hot Girl Meg" on her EP, Fever. She has also referred to herself as "Thee Hood Tyra Banks".

Trademarks

Megan originated the viral catchphrase "hot girl summer" on social media. It is a derivative of another of her most-known catchphrases, "hot girl", also derived from "real hot girl shit". She first used the phrase in a tweet on April 14, 2018. It later appeared on the Fever album cover, which read, "She's thee HOT GIRL and she's bringing THEE HEAT." She defined the term as "women and men being unapologetically them, just having a good-ass time, hyping up their friends, doing you." Megan Thee Stallion officially trademarked the term "hot girl summer" in September 2019 after applying for it in July of that year. A song of the same name was released on August 9, 2019.

In addition to "hot girl" and "hot girl summer", Megan Thee Stallion is known for her signature ad-lib which involves sticking her tongue out, creating a "creaky", audible "agh" or "blah" sound. In August 2019, Twitter created an official emoji for this tongue symbol which could be spawned directly after the hashtag "#megantheestallion". This symbol also inspired the cover art of her EP Suga which was revealed in March 2020.

Other ventures 
In September  2021, Megan partnered with Nike for a promotional campaign and fitness program through the Nike Training Club app. In October 2021, Megan appeared on First We Feast and Complex Media's Hot Ones. On October 14, 2021, it was announced that Megan Thee Stallion signed a wide-ranging deal with multinational fast-food company Popeyes that includes her own Popeyes franchise, a new hot sauce (Megan Thee Stallion Hottie Sauce) and co-branded merchandise.  She partnered with Cheetos for a Super Bowl commercial in 2022.

Megan was on the grid of the 2021 United States Grand Prix where attempts to interview her by Martin Brundle were snubbed by her bodyguards leading to criticism, causing F1 to introduce the "Brundle Clause", prohibiting bodyguards on the race grid.

Television and film 
On December 16, 2021, she signed an exclusive first-look deal at Netflix, to create and executive produce new series and other projects. On February 17, 2022, it was announced that Megan will co-star in A24's first movie musical titled F*cking Identical Twins, described as "a spin on The Parent Trap". She guest starred in the Disney+ Marvel Cinematic Universe series She-Hulk: Attorney at Law as a fictionalized version of herself.

Philanthropy
She contributed $15,400 worth of Thanksgiving turkeys and helped hand them out to 1,050 households in need at the Houston Food Bank portwall pantry, in November 2019. In April 2020, she donated over $10,000 to bail relief effort for Houston protestors. The same month, Megan teamed up with Amazon Music to donate to a Nursing Facility in Houston. All the proceeds collected from her collaboration on Beyonce's Savage (remix) went to Bread of Life, which helps local Houston communities with Covid-19 relief efforts. The song raised over $2.5 million.

In October 2020, she partnered with Amazon Music's rap rotation and launched the "Don't Stop" scholarship fund that awarded two women of color pursuing associate, bachelor or postgraduate degrees, $10,000 each. In February 2021, she launched "Hotties Helping Houston" with US House Democrat Rep. Sheila Jackson Lee of Texas, the National Association of Christian Churches disaster services, Taraji P. Henson, 300 Entertainment, Maroon 5, Revlon, Mielle Organics, Fashion Nova, and Billie Eilish to help senior citizens and single moms recovering from the area's storm related devastation. In March 2021, she collaborated with Fashion Nova for the 'Women on Top" initiative, which would give away $1 million dollars to support female-owned businesses and organizations. The same month, along with Fashion Nova and journalist May Lee, they donated $50,000 after the Atlanta spa shootings to the legal non-profit, Advancing Justice Atlanta.

In June 2021, she offered a full tuition, four year scholarship to the Roc Nation school of music, sports & entertainment at Long Island University. In June 2021, she partnered with Cash App to make "Investing for Hotties" educational videos. This partnership also donated $1 million dollars worth of stock to randomly-selected fans.

In October 2021, as part of her wide-ranging agreement with Popeyes, she made a six-figure donation to the charitable organization Houston Random Acts of Kindness.

BTS Army launched "Thee Army Fund" project, in collaboration with the "Hotties" which raised over $120,000 to donate to three different organizations: (Woman for Afghan Women, Black Women of Wellness, and Houston Food Bank) in her name to congratulate her on the Butter (Remix). As part of her ceremony to receive the key to the city of Houston, the non-profit Pete and Thomas Foundation donated $5,000 to three people in Houston to assist with their education, housing and wellness expenses.

Personal life
Megan Thee Stallion mentioned being part Creole in her songs "Cocky AF" and "Freak Nasty" as well as in a tweet in September 2017. Her mother, Holly Thomas, died in March 2019 from a longstanding cancerous brain tumor, and Megan's great-grandmother died in the same month. She mentioned her mother's death (Ever since my mama died, 2019) on beginning of her song "Flip Flop" from the second studio album, Traumazine, released on August 12, 2022. In addition to acting as her manager, Megan's grandmother was a major influence on her decision to study health administration and also helped foster her goal to establish assisted living facilities in her hometown of Houston.

She has six dogs: three French bulldogs named 4oe (pronounced Four), Dos, and Oneita; a Cane Corso named X (Ten); a Pitbull named Five; and a Merle Dog named Six.

She is a huge fan of anime and her favorites are My Hero Academia and Naruto.

Megan Thee Stallion confirmed her relationship with fellow rapper Pardison Fontaine via Instagram Live on February 19, 2021.

She is openly bisexual.

Tory Lanez shooting 

On July 15, 2020, Megan Thee Stallion stated that she had suffered gunshot wounds, and that she had undergone surgery to remove the bullets. Her statement countered an earlier TMZ report that she had injured her foot on broken glass three days prior when she was in a car with rap and R&B musician Tory Lanez (Daystar Peterson) and an unidentified woman.  The car was pulled over by police, and Peterson was arrested on gun charges following a vehicle search.

On July 27, 2020, Megan revealed that she had been shot in both feet, and denounced rumors in an Instagram Live session where she recounted the shooting incident and cried. The following month, Megan claimed that Peterson was the person who shot her, saying, "I didn't tell the police what happened immediately right there because I didn't want to die."

On September 25, 2020, Peterson released his fifth album, Daystar, in which he addressed Megan's allegations in nearly every song, denying that he shot her while also claiming that she and her team were "trying to frame" him.

The same day, in a statement to Variety, Megan's attorney, Alex Spiro, claimed Peterson's representatives had attempted to launch a "smear campaign," using falsified messages to "peddle a false narrative" discrediting Megan. Peterson's team denied this, stating that they would investigate whoever was behind the fake emails, then would take appropriate action. Megan later confirmed that she had been offered money by Peterson and his team to keep quiet on the incident, following the incident.

On October 8, 2020, Peterson was charged with shooting Megan Thee Stallion by L.A. County prosecutors. His arraignment was scheduled on October 13; however, it was rescheduled for November 18 after Peterson's attorney requested a continuance. Megan was issued a protection order against Peterson, directing him to stay at least 100 yards away from her, and to not contact her. He was also ordered to surrender any guns he owns.

In an op-ed for The New York Times, published on October 13, 2020, Megan addressed the shooting allegation further, writing, "Black women are still constantly disrespected and disregarded in so many areas of life. I was recently the victim of an act of violence by a man. After a party, I was shot twice as I walked away from him. We were not in a relationship. Truthfully, I was shocked that I ended up in that place."

Peterson pleaded not guilty to assault with a semiautomatic handgun in late November 2020. In the same month, Megan Thee Stallion released her debut studio album, Good News, on which the album opener is the diss track "Shots Fired" directed towards Peterson. The song gained acclaim, with many critics noting that it samples and interpolates the 1995 song "Who Shot Ya?" by The Notorious B.I.G.

In April 2022, Peterson was arrested for violating the protection order relating to the case; and he was released shortly after on an increased bond of $350,000. On December 13, 2022, Megan Thee Stallion testified in Lanez's assault trial, reliving the events from two years prior, stating that she "wish[ed] she had died". On December 23, 2022, a jury convicted Lanez on three felony charges stemming from the shooting: assault with a semiautomatic handgun, having a loaded and unregistered firearm in a vehicle, and gross negligence in discharging his firearm.

Discography

 Good News (2020)
 Traumazine (2022)

Filmography

Film

Television

Tours

Supporting

 Bad Girls Tour  (2018; cancelled)
 Legendary Nights Tour  (2019)
 Future Nostalgia Tour  (2022)

Awards and nominations

See also 
 List of artists who reached number one in the United States
Southern hip hop

Notes

References

External links

 
 

 
1995 births
Music YouTubers
American YouTubers
21st-century African-American women
21st-century African-American musicians
21st-century American rappers
21st-century American women musicians
21st-century American LGBT people
21st-century women rappers
African-American songwriters
African-American women rappers
African-American women singers
American people of Creole descent
American shooting survivors
American women rappers
American bisexual people
Bisexual women
Entertainers from Houston
Grammy Award winners
LGBT African Americans
LGBT rappers
Living people
Pearland High School alumni
People from Pearland, Texas
Prairie View A&M University alumni
Rappers from Houston
Rappers from San Antonio
Rappers from Texas
Shooting survivors
Songwriters from Texas
Southern hip hop musicians
Texas Southern University alumni
Trap musicians